The Masonic Opera House, also known as the What Cheer Opera House, is a historic building located in What Cheer, Iowa, United States. It is a Romanesque Revival style building from 1893.  The  facility has served as a clubhouse, an auditorium, a music facility, and a cinema.  The third floor originally housed a Masonic hall.  Emblems associated with Freemasonry are still located on a decorative pediment at the top of the building.  The auditorium seats 350 on the main floor, and 240 in the balcony.  The second floor served the balcony patrons. It was listed on the National Register of Historic Places in 1973.

References

Masonic buildings completed in 1893
Theatres completed in 1893
National Register of Historic Places in Keokuk County, Iowa
Former Masonic buildings in Iowa
Clubhouses on the National Register of Historic Places in Iowa
Theatres on the National Register of Historic Places in Iowa
Opera houses on the National Register of Historic Places in Iowa
Opera houses in Iowa